LeShon Eugene Johnson (born January 15, 1971) is an American former professional football player who was a running back and kick returner in the National Football League (NFL) for six seasons during the 1990s.  He played college football for Northern Illinois University, and earned All-American honors.  He was picked by the Green Bay Packers in the third round of the 1994 NFL Draft. He also played professionally for the Arizona Cardinals and New York Giants of the NFL and the Chicago Enforcers of the XFL (2001).

Early years
Johnson was born in Haskell, Oklahoma.  He was a standout high school running back at Haskell High School.  Johnson was a bull rider on the junior rodeo circuit, earning the nickname the "Cowboy," which followed him throughout his football career.

College career
Johnson attended Northeastern Oklahoma A&M College, before transferring to Northern Illinois University as a junior.  At Northern Illinois, he played for the Northern Illinois Huskies football team in 1992 and 1993.  As a senior in 1993, Johnson was the leading college rusher with 1,976 yards on 327 carries for an average of 179.6 yards per game.  Johnson finished sixth in the 1993 Heisman Trophy voting race, with five first-place votes.  He played only two years for the Huskies, but his total yards mark of 3,314 still places him fifth on the team's all-time rushing list.

Professional career

In Johnson's career-best game, he rushed for 214 yards on 21 carries for the Cardinals versus the New Orleans Saints on September 22, 1996. His career was interrupted by lymphoma cancer in 1998. His football career ended playing in the XFL for the Chicago Enforcers.

Life after football
Johnson pleaded guilty in 2005 to the crime of dog fighting in Okmulgee County, Oklahoma.  He received a five-year deferred sentence.

See also
 List of college football yearly rushing leaders

References

1971 births
Living people
American football running backs
Arizona Cardinals players
Chicago Enforcers players
Green Bay Packers players
New York Giants players
Northeastern Oklahoma A&M Golden Norsemen football players
Northern Illinois Huskies football players
All-American college football players
Ed Block Courage Award recipients
People from Haskell, Oklahoma
Players of American football from Oklahoma
African-American players of American football
20th-century African-American sportspeople
21st-century African-American sportspeople